Manasi Salvi (born 19 January 1980) is an Indian television and film actress. She is best known for her roles in television shows; Kohi Apna Sa (2001–2003) and Pyaar Ka Dard Hai Meetha Meetha Pyaara Pyaara (2012–2014).

Career
Salvi played the role of Avantika, Aditya's mother, in Star Plus's Pyaar Ka Dard Hai Meetha Meetha Pyaara Pyaara. She started her career on small screen with Zee TV's program Aashirwad which led to the role of Khushi, one of the three protagonists, in Ekta Kapoor's Kohi Apna Sa. In 2005, she appeared in the serial Saarrthi in which she played a character named Manasvi Goenka. That same year she made her film debut in a Marathi production produced by Lata Narvekar and directed by Gajendra Ahire.

Early and personal life
In 2005, Salvi married Hemant Prabhu, the director of the weekly drama Siddhant that aired on Star One. Prabhu also directed Salvi in the TV show Sati...Satya Ki Shakti.

In 2008 she gave a birth to their daughter Oshima Prabhu. In 2016 Manasi and Hemant Got Divorced.

Filmography

Films

Television

Awards

 Kalakar Award 2002 for Best Actress - Kohi Apna Sa
 Zee Gold Award 2013 for Best Supporting Actress - Pyaar Ka Dard Hai Meetha Meetha Pyaara Pyaara
Zee Marathi Ustav Natyancha Awards 2020-21 for Best Performance of the Year - Kaay Ghadla Tya Ratri?

References

External links 

Living people
Marathi actors
Actresses in Marathi cinema
Indian film actresses
1980 births